A cradle is an infant bed which rocks but is non-mobile. It is distinct from a typical bassinet which is a basket-like container on free-standing legs with wheels. A carbonized cradle was found in the remains of Herculaneum left from the destruction of the city by the eruption of Mount Vesuvius in 79 CE.

References

Infancy
Beds